Radio Factory RET (abbreviated RET) was an electronics factory in Tallinn, Estonia.

RET was established in 1935. In 1940, the factory was named to "Punane RET" ('Red RET').

During Soviet Estonia, the factory produced military products and high-class radio devices called "Estonia".

In 1993, the factory was closed.

References

Manufacturing companies of Estonia
Economy of Tallinn
Electronics companies of the Soviet Union
Defence companies of the Soviet Union
Companies nationalised by the Soviet Union